David and the Elves (Polish: Dawid i Elfy) is Polish Christmas comedy film directed by Michał Rogalski from a screenplay by Mateusz Kuczewski and Marcin Baczyński. The film was released worldwide on Netflix on December 6, 2021.

Plot
A young boy named David (Cyprian Grabowski) lives happily with his parents (Anna Smołowik, Michal Czernecki) and grandparents in the Tatra Mountains. His family cultivates Christmas traditions. Everything changes when he moves to Warsaw with his parents, who now have much more work. On the next Christmas season a popular Santa Claus' elf named Albert (Jakub Zając) runs away from the North Pole to find David, thinking he can help him to restore his Christmas power. Albert believes that people love him, but reality turns out to be different. David and the elf go on a journey to his grandparents' house. At the same time Santa Claus (Cezary Żak) with Mrs. Claus (Monika Krzywkowska) and David's parents try to find and save them.

Cast 
 Cyprian Grabowski as David Kosmala
 Jakub Zając as Albert the Elf
 Anna Smolownik as Hania Kosmala, David's Mom
 Michał Czernecki as Piotr Kosmala, David's Dad
 Cezary Żak as Santa Claus
 Monika Krzywkowska as Mrs. Claus
 Piotr Rogucki as Erwin the Elf
 Elżbieta Jarosik as Grandma Matylda
 Witold Dębicki as Grandpa Ignacy

Production
The movie was filmed mostly in Zakopane and Warsaw, Poland. It was released on December 6, 2021. English version is available as dubbed or with subtitles.

Reception
Common Sense Media rated it 2 out of 5 stars.

See also
 List of Christmas films

References

External links 
 David and the Elves at Filmweb (Polish)
 https://www.netflix.com/pl/title/81416534 - Official site on Netflix
 

2021 films
2020s Christmas comedy films
Polish Christmas films
Polish-language Netflix original films
2020s adventure comedy films
2020s fantasy comedy films
Santa Claus in film
2020s Polish-language films